Maurice E. Lagacé (born October 29, 1931) is a judge currently serving on the Federal Court of Canada.

References

1931 births
Living people
Judges of the Federal Court of Canada
People from Verdun, Quebec